Carex microglochin, called the fewseeded bog sedge and bristle sedge, is a species of flowering plant in the genus Carex, native to temperate and subarctic North America, South America, Europe and Asia. It is uncertain which hemisphere it originated on before dispersing to the other.

References

microglochin
Plants described in 1803